Wickremasinghe, Wickremesinghe or Wickramasinghe is a Sinhalese surname. Notable people with the name include:

Surname
 Chandra Wickramasinghe (born 1939), British mathematician and astronomer
 Don Martino de Zilva Wickremasinghe (died 1937), Ceylonese epigraphist and archeologist
 Doreen Young Wickremasinghe, Ceylonese politician
 Gamini Wickremasinghe (born 1965), Sri Lankan cricketer
 Jagath Wickramasinghe (born 1966), Sri Lankan musician
 Lakshman Wickremasinghe (1927–1983), Sri Lankan priest
 Maitree Wickramasinghe, Sri Lankan academic
 Martin Wickramasinghe (1890–1976), Ceylonese author
 Neela Wickramasinghe (1954–2022), Sri Lankan singer
 Neranjan Wickremasinghe (1961–2015), Sri Lankan politician
 Nira Wickramasinghe (born 1964), Sri Lankan academic
 Pramodya Wickramasinghe (born 1971), Sri Lankan cricketer
 Rajika Wickramasinghe (born 1973), Sri Lankan politician
 Ranil Wickremesinghe (born 1949), Sri Lankan politician
 S. A. Wickramasinghe (1901–1981), Ceylonese politician
 Shelley Wickramasinghe (1926–2011), Sri Lankan cricket official
 Sunitha Wickramasinghe, British physician and academic
 Udaya Wickramasinghe (1939–2010), Sri Lankan cricket official
 Umayangana Wickramasinghe (born 1980), Sri Lankan actress
 W. Wickremasinghe (1899-?), Ceylonese politician

As a forename
 Wickramasinghe Archchilage Chandrawathi (born 1981), Sri Lankan cricketer
 Wickremasinghe Rajaguru (born 1938), Sri Lankan police officer
 Wickremasinghe Wimaladasa (born 1943), Sri Lankan athlete

See also
 
 
 Wickramasinghapura, suburb of Colombo, Sri Lanka

Sinhalese surnames